The Sunshine Women's Open was a golf tournament on the LPGA Tour from 1959 to 1963. It was played at the Miami Springs Country Club in Miami Springs, Florida from 1959 to 1962 and at the LeJeune Golf Club in Miami, Florida in 1963.

Winners
Sunshine Women's Open
1963 Betsy Rawls

Sunshine Open
1962 Marilynn Smith

Miami Open
1961 Mickey Wright

MAGA Pro-Am
1960 No tournament
1959 Wiffi Smith

References

Former LPGA Tour events
Golf in Florida
Sports competitions in Miami
1959 establishments in Florida
1963 disestablishments in Florida
Women's sports in Florida